The discography of American music group The Osmond Brothers consists of twenty-eight albums and forty-three singles.

Until 2008, The Osmonds' 1960s and 1970s albums had not been released on CD legitimately in any country. Several 2-for-1 bootleg collections have been released on all of the original catalogs, most notably the first and original four-album sets released on the Maestro label. Maestro released the albums as an original master series with hard-to-find bonus tracks in top quality sound. Each set contained four albums on two CDs, with all original album covers and MGM label art work intact. The albums were finally reissued in 2008 by British label Cherry Red Records offshoot imprint, 7t's, beginning with 1971's Osmonds / Homemade and wrapping up the series with 1975's Around the World – Live In Concert.

This discography only covers songs recorded as and billed to The Osmonds or The Osmond Brothers as a whole. It does not include solo or duet recordings by members of the Osmond family, which are chronicled separately.

Albums

Studio albums

Live albums

Compilation albums

Singles

See also 
 Donny and Marie Osmond discography
 Donny Osmond discography
 Marie Osmond discography
 Little Jimmy Osmond discography

Notes

References

External links
The Osmond Store Official website

Discographies of American artists
Pop music group discographies
Rock music group discographies